Jeffrey George Crank (born January 28, 1967) is an American politician. He is a former candidate for United States Representative for Colorado's 5th congressional district.

Early life, education, and career
Crank was born in 1967 and graduated from Central High School in 1985. He graduated from Colorado State University in 1990, with a B.A. in Political Science. From 1991 to 1998, he worked as a congressional staffer for Representative Joel Hefley, being a Legislative Assistant until being promoted as Administrative Director in April 1995. After working for Congressman Hefley, he became Vice President of the Colorado Springs Chamber of Commerce in May 1998 and was later promoted to Senior Vice President in October 2001. He left the Greater Colorado Springs Chamber of Commerce in February 2006.

Crank was elected as Chairman of the 5th Congressional District Republican Central Committee in 2001 and 2003. In 2003, he was appointed to the Colorado Emergency Planning Commission by Governor of Colorado Bill Owens for a two-year term and also served on the El Paso County Citizens Corps Council in 2004. He was the El Paso county co-chair for President George W. Bush's re-election campaign in 2004. Crank was later elected in 2004 to serve on the Colorado State Republican Central Committee as a bonus member.

Crank served as the Colorado State Director for Americans for Prosperity from May 2009 to August 2013. He resigned from the position to form a political consulting company, Aegis Strategic.

US House of Representatives Campaign
Crank ran for US Representative in 2006 to replace retiring incumbent Representative Joel Hefley. He narrowly lost the Republican primary to State Legislator Doug Lamborn. Crank had received endorsements from several major politicians including Joel Hefley.

Personal life
Crank lives in Colorado Springs, Colorado, with his wife Lisa and their two children. He has his own radio program on KVOR, The Jeff Crank Show.

Elections

References

People from Pueblo, Colorado
Politicians from Colorado Springs, Colorado
Colorado State University alumni
Colorado Republicans
American talk radio hosts
Living people
1967 births
Radio personalities from Colorado